The Macedonian Orthodox Diocese of Europe is a diocese of the Macedonian Orthodox Church in Western Europe. It is headed by Metropolitan Pimen of Europe from 06.4.2006.

The diocese today has 35 church communities across western European countries, of which 13 are in Germany. In its period of existence the diocese has built 4 new churches in Malmö, Triengen, Berlin and Mainz. Another one is being built in Zagreb. In London, the church worships in the chapel of the House of St Barnabas in Soho.

List of Orthodox Churches
 St. Naum of Ohrid church in Malmö
 St. Nikola church in Mainz
 St. Naum of Ohrid church in Triengen
 St. Kliment of Ohrid church in Berlin
 St. Zlata of Meglen church in Zagreb
 St. emperor Konstantin and empress Elena in Rijeka

References

Macedonian Orthodox dioceses
Eastern Orthodox dioceses in Europe